Beijing Shijingshan Amusement Park is a theme park located in Bajiao, Shijingshan District of Beijing, China. First opened on September 28, 1986, the park is currently owned and operated by the Shijingshan District government. The park is served by Bajiao Amusement Park station on Line 1 of the Beijing Subway.

History
Beijing Shijingshan Amusement Park opened on 28 September 1986 as one of Beijing's first amusement parks. The park opened with the Atomic Roller Coaster and other rides and attractions. The park then went to open nine new roller coasters in the 2000s and a further three in the 2010s, including a rebuilt Crazy Mouse roller coaster. The park's original roller coaster, the Atomic Coaster closed in 2018 after 24 years of operations. In 2021, the park underwent an upgrade which saw the addition of three new roller coasters.

Attractions

Operating roller coasters
 Crazy Mouse (2015–)
 Crazy Skateboard (2017–)
 Family Roller Coaster (2021–)
 Fruit Worm Coaster (2019–)
 Space Pulley (2021–)
 Stacked Roller Coaster (2021–)

Former roller coasters

 Atomic Coaster (1986–2018)
 Crazy Mouse (2003–2012)
 Feng Shen Coaster (2003–2014)
 Jurassic Adventure (2008–2015)
 Mine Coaster (2003–2017)
 Shenzhou Coaster (2005–2019)
 Space Trip (2003–2015)
 Spinning Batman (2008–2010)
 Spinning Coaster (2004–2017)
 Worm Coaster (2003–2015)

Park gallery

Copyright infringement controversy
In May 2007, the park was exposed by international media for having made unauthorized use of Japanese and American cartoon characters. According to a report originally broadcast on Fuji TV's FNN News, the park features a castle that resembles Disney's trademark Sleeping Beauty Castle and a structure that looks like Epcot's Spaceship Earth. The park also features a host of costumed characters that look remarkably similar to not only Disney's trademark characters, but also Shrek, Hello Kitty, Doraemon, Bugs Bunny and a number of other trademarked characters.

Park officials denied any wrongdoing. When asked by the FNN News reporter if the characters are related to Disney, the theme park's general manager Liu Jingwang said that their characters are based on Grimm's Fairy Tales.

According to a May 10, 2007, Associated Press report, the park deputy general manager Yin Zhiqiang said that the park's lawyers are in negotiation with The Walt Disney Company. Disney declined to comment directly on this matter.

Between 2010 and 2011, the park was expanded and refurbished. China Daily reports the Disney-themed characters may have been removed from the park.

Transportation

Subway
Bajiao Amusement Park station of Beijing Subway, on Line 1.

Bus
Bus 663 serves the park's west entrance.

See also
 Happy Valley Beijing – in Chaoyang District, Beijing

References

External links
 Beijing Shijingshan Amusement Park website  (defunct),  (Wayback Machine Link)
 Official website (English) (defunct)

Beijing's Copycat Disneyland Controversy 
  Fakes a real fact of life in China's heated economy, The Standard

Amusement parks in Beijing
Tourist attractions in Beijing
Buildings and structures in Beijing
1986 establishments in China
Amusement parks opened in 1986
Shijingshan District